FC Akhtala, is a defunct Armenian football club from Akhtala, Lori Province. The club was formed in 1998 and participated in the Armenian First League season in 1992. However, the club was dissolved by the end of the 1992.

League record

References
RSSSF Armenia (and subpages per year)

Association football clubs disestablished in 1992
Akhtala
1992 disestablishments in Armenia